Taoufik Baccar is a Tunisian politician. He was the governor of the Central Bank of Tunisia from 2004 to 2011.

Biography
In 1995, Taoufik Baccar was appointed Tunisia's Minister of Economic Development,

becoming Minister of Finance in 1999.
 Subsequently, he became the Governor of the Central Bank of Tunisia.

References

Government ministers of Tunisia
Living people
Tunisian economists
Governors of the Central Bank of Tunisia
Finance ministers of Tunisia
Year of birth missing (living people)